A list of films produced in Argentina in 1996:

External links and references
 Argentine films of 1996 at the Internet Movie Database

1996
Argentine
Films